Fred Churchill Leonard (February 16, 1856 – December 5, 1921) was a Republican member of the U.S. House of Representatives from Pennsylvania.

Fred C. Leonard was born in Elmer, Pennsylvania. He attended the public schools, the State normal school at Mansfield, Pennsylvania, and Williston Seminary in Easthampton, Massachusetts.  He graduated from Yale College in 1883.  He studied law in Wellsboro, Pennsylvania, and was admitted to the bar in 1885.  He moved to Elmira, New York, and thence, in 1887, to Coudersport, Pennsylvania, and practiced law.

Leonard was elected as a Republican to the Fifty-fourth Congress.  He was an unsuccessful candidate for renomination in 1896.  He resumed the practice of law in Coudersport.  He served as United States marshal for the western district of Pennsylvania from January 15, 1898, until May 6, 1901, when he was transferred to the middle district and served until July 2, 1906.  He was engaged in banking, and died in Coudersport in 1921.  Interment in Eulalia Cemetery.

Sources

The Political Graveyard

Pennsylvania lawyers
1856 births
1921 deaths
Mansfield University of Pennsylvania alumni
Williston Northampton School alumni
Yale College alumni
United States Marshals
People from Potter County, Pennsylvania
Republican Party members of the United States House of Representatives from Pennsylvania
19th-century American lawyers